Gandra is a Portuguese hamlet located in the parish of Balazar, Póvoa de Varzim.

Geography of Póvoa de Varzim

es:Gandra
pt:Gandra